Chennai Egmore, formerly known as Madras Egmore, also known as Chennai Elumbur (station code: MS), is a railway station in Chennai, Tamil Nadu, India. Situated in the neighborhood of Egmore, it is one of the four intercity railway terminals in the city; the other three are Chennai Central railway station, Tambaram railway station and Chennai Beach railway station. The station was built in 1906–1908 as the terminus of the South Indian Railway Company. The building built in Gothic style is one of the prominent landmarks of Chennai. The main entrance to the station is situated on Gandhi-Irwin Road and the rear entrance on Poonamallee High Road.

The station was apparently constructed from 8679 on land purchased from Pulney Andy. The building is built in the Gothic style of architecture with imposing domes and corridors. It has the 5th longest platform in the country and the 6th longest in the world. The station is one of the prominent landmarks of the city of Chennai. The recently opened northern entrance to this railway station is on the arterial Poonamallee High Road in Chennai city.

History

History says that the station was actually a fort, called the Egmore Redoubt, similar to Leith Castle, which is a part of Santhome. It is said that the station came up in a place that once used to store ammunition for the British.

However, the South Indian Railway (SIR) Company, which was then operating train services to the south, persuaded him to sell the land, for which Andy claimed  as compensation. After acquiring the land, the SIR invited Henry Irwin, CIE (chief engineer), who did much of latter day Indo-Saracenic in Madras, and E. C. Bird, company architect, to design a building to suit the traffic need. After several alterations in the plan, the construction work began in September 1905 and was completed in 1908. The station was officially opened on 11 June 1908.

There was initially a demand that the station be named after Robert Clive, which was, however, strongly opposed by the public as they wanted to name it Egmore. When the station was opened there was no electricity connection and a generator was used. The station became the major metre-gauge terminal for Chennai after the formation of Southern Railway in 1951 and served as the gateway to the southern Tamil Nadu, chiefly due to its acting as a connecting point for passengers from the south to the Chennai Central for boarding north-, west- and east-bound trains. Irwin and Bird worked on the design of the building, which was sympathetically added to in the 1930s and 1980s. In the 1990s it was converted into a major broad gauge terminal, a role in which it became operational in 1998.

Earlier, cars used to come inside the platform itself, which was found only in this station. In its report, the SIR commented on the construction of a new building for Egmore:

SIR also claimed during the inauguration of the new building that it had given Madras a building to be proud of, "whose covered platform area is greater than that of Charing Cross Station in London."

The signalling of the station is controlled by a Siemens all-electric power frame of 1935.

A new suburban station building was opened in November 2004 when the Tambaram–Beach broad-gauge section became fully operational. With increasing passenger traffic, the entrance on the Gandhi-Irwin Road eventually became insufficient. In June 2006, the second entrance was opened.

Layout
Platforms 1, 2 and 3 are on the eastern side. They are relatively short in length. They are used for short trains. Platform 4 is the main platform leading to the portico. Platforms 4, 5, 6 and 7 lie under the dome. These are used for long-distance trains. Platforms 10 and 11 are newly constructed ones that are handling broad-gauge electric multiple units (EMUs or suburban electric trains). Some platforms have escalators. The platform is the 5th longest in the country and the 6th longest in the world.

Chennai Egmore station is not a junction. This can be understood also from its name. It has one line towards Chennai Beach railway station (via Park Town and Fort), while the other is towards Tambaram railway station (via Mambalam).

Traffic

As of 2013, the station handles about 35 main line trains and 118 suburban trains, and about 150,000 people daily.

Maintenance

The station has been divided into two zones for mechanised cleaning contracts—platforms 1 to 6 fall under zone I and platforms 7 to 11 fall under zone II. In December 2012, Southern Railway awarded contract to a new agency with a 43-member team taking charge of upkeep of zone II.

Train care centre
The station has a train care centre named Egmore Railway Yard(GSN Yard – Gopal Samy Nagar), where the trains arriving at the station are prepared for departure. However, the centre is soiled and grimy due to lack of maintenance.

Amenities
There are 14-bedded air-conditioned dormitories and 16 retiring rooms on the first floor of the station. Three new waiting halls were added to the prepaid AC hall and second call hall. In 2019–2020, platforms 5, 7, 8, and 9 were extended to accommodate locomotives.

Connectivity
The station has two entrance, viz. the main southern entrance on the Gandhi–Irwin Road and the secondary northern entrance on the Poonamallee High Road. Both the entrances has MTC bus routes passing through them and have pre-paid taxi and autorickshaw counters. While the southern entrance has a bus shelter, the northern entrance has a two-storey parking lot and a bus terminus.
The station is also connected to the Chennai Metro Rail Line 2, serving as an underground station.

Security

In April 2012, the Government Railway Police (GRP) and the Railway Protection Force (RPF) together launched a helpline known as Kaakum karangal (literally meaning 'Protecting hands') in the terminus. This involved dividing the terminus into three sectors and deploying 18 police personnel for security.

The main station has CCTV cameras installed. The suburban platforms are covered by the  Integrated Security Surveillance System (ISSS) project implemented in 2012. The project, implemented jointly by the Southern Railways and HCL Infosystems, includes installation of CCTV cameras that would record visuals around the clock and store the data for 30 days, with the footage transmitted and stored using an Internet Protocol system.

Future

The station serves not only to the south but also to the north (Hyderabad) and east. Additionally, the Chennai–Mumbai Dadar Central Express (west) originates from the Egmore station.

As the growth potential at Chennai Egmore station is limited due to space constraint, the railway is planning to originate or terminate some of the additional trains to be introduced in future at Tambaram railway station. However, the station will remain a hub of train services and there is no proposal to shift all the services to Tambaram.

In February 2013, as part of a national initiative to eliminate ballast tracks at major stations, washable aprons—ballastless tracks or tracks on a concrete bed—were laid along the entire length of track of platform 2 at the terminus.

Legacy
Though several changes were made to the station, the letters "SIR" emblazoned on its bas relief crest still remains, though the middle letter 'I' was painted out a few years ago to read "SR" (meaning Southern Railway).

See also

 Chennai Central railway station
 Chennai Suburban Railway
 Railway stations in Chennai
 Heritage structures in Chennai

References

External links 
 

1908 establishments in India
Chennai railway division
Heritage sites in Chennai
Railway stations in Chennai
Railway stations opened in 1908
Stations of Chennai Suburban Railway